{{Infobox person
| name               = Josephine Baker
| image              = File:Baker Harcourt 1940 2.jpg
| caption            = Baker in 1940
| birth_name         = Freda Josephine McDonald
| birth_date         = 
| birth_place        = St. Louis, Missouri, U.S.
| death_date         = 
| death_place        = Paris, France
| resting_place      = Monaco Cemetery
| nationality        = American (renounced)French (1937–1975)
| occupation         = Vedette, singer, dancer, actress, civil rights activist, French Resistance agent
| years_active       = 1921–1975
| spouse             = 
| partner            = Robert Brady (1973–1975)
| children           = 12; Jean-Claude Baker presented himself as her foster son (contested by the Baker children<ref>[https://www.sudouest.fr/dordogne/sarlat-la-caneda/je-lui-dois-bien-plus-que-ca-9224950.php Sud ouest, « Je lui dois bien plus que ça », 03/24, 2012]</ref>)
| signature          = Signature de Joséphine Baker - Archives nationales (France).png
| module             = 
}}

Freda Josephine Baker (June 3, 1906 – April 12, 1975), naturalised as Joséphine Baker, was an American-born French dancer, singer and actress. Her career was centered primarily in Europe, mostly in her adopted France.

Her performance in the revue  in 1927 caused a sensation in the city. Her costume, consisting of only a short skirt of artificial bananas and a beaded necklace, became an iconic image and a symbol both of the Jazz Age and the Roaring Twenties.

Baker was celebrated by artists and intellectuals of the era, who variously dubbed her the "Black Venus", the "Black Pearl", the "Bronze Venus", and the "Creole Goddess". Born in St. Louis, Missouri, she renounced her U.S. citizenship and became a French national after her marriage to French industrialist Jean Lion in 1937. She raised her children in France.

She aided the French Resistance during World War II. Baker sang: "I have two loves, my country and Paris."

Baker refused to perform for segregated audiences in the United States and is noted for her contributions to the civil rights movement. In 1968, she was offered unofficial leadership in the movement in the United States by Coretta Scott King, following Martin Luther King Jr.'s assassination. After thinking it over, Baker declined the offer out of concern for the welfare of her children.

On November 30, 2021, she was inducted into the Panthéon in Paris, the first black woman to receive one of the highest honors in France. As her resting place remains in Monaco Cemetery, a cenotaph was installed in vault 13 of the crypt in the Panthéon.

 Early life 

Freda Josephine McDonald was born on June 3, 1906, in St. Louis, Missouri. Her mother Carrie, was adopted in Little Rock, Arkansas, in 1886 by Richard and Elvira McDonald, both of whom were former slaves of African and Native American descent. Baker's estate and some other sources identify vaudeville drummer Eddie Carson as her natural father, whilst other sources dispute this. Baker's foster son Jean-Claude Baker wrote a biography, published in 1993, titled Josephine: The Hungry Heart, in which he discusses at length the circumstances surrounding Baker's birth based on his research, concluding that Baker's father was white, and that Baker knew that Carson was not her father. Academic Bennetta Jules-Rosette, author of Josephine Baker in Art and Life: The Icon and the Image (2007) wrote about the difficulty of establishing the truth of Baker's early life, given "the factual and counterfactual reworkings of her numerous biographers" and Baker's own "numerous and often contradictory reworkings of the story, which frequently lacked coherence".

Josephine McDonald spent her early life on 212 Targee Street (known by some St. Louis residents as Johnson Street) in the Chestnut Valley neighborhood of St. Louis, a racially mixed low-income neighborhood near Union Station, consisting mainly of rooming houses, brothels, and apartments without indoor plumbing. She was poorly dressed, hungry as a child, and developed street smarts playing in the railroad yards of Union Station.

Her mother married Arthur Martin, "a kind but perpetually unemployed man", with whom she had a son and two more daughters. She took in laundry to wash to make ends meet, and at eight years old, Josephine began working as a live-in domestic for white families in St. Louis. One woman abused her, burning Josephine's hands when the young girl put too much soap in the laundry.

In 1917, when she was 11, a terrified Josephine McDonald witnessed racial violence in East St. Louis. In a speech years later, she recalled what she had seen:I can still see myself standing on the west bank of the Mississippi looking over into East St. Louis and watching the glow of the burning of Negro homes lighting the sky. We children stood huddled together in bewilderment ... frightened to death with the screams of the Negro families running across this bridge with nothing but what they had on their backs as their worldly belongings... So with this vision I ran and ran and ran....

By age 12, she had dropped out of school. At 13, she worked as a waitress at the Old Chauffeur's Club at 3133 Pine Street. She also lived as a street child in the slums of St. Louis, sleeping in cardboard shelters, scavenging for food in garbage cans, making a living with street-corner dancing. It was at the Old Chauffeur's Club where Josephine met Willie Wells, and subsequently married him at age 13; however, the marriage lasted less than a year. Following her divorce from Wells, she found work with a street performance group called the Jones Family Band.

In her teen years she struggled to have a healthy relationship with her mother, who did not want her to become an entertainer and scolded her for not tending to her second husband, William Howard Baker, whom she married in 1921 at the age of 15.Uncertainty about her career and her need for love and respectability made her consider marrying Pepito on whom she could depend, and who loved her. However, she was still married to Willie Baker, which didn't prevent the "couple" from announcing to the press that they had wed in June 1927. She left him when her vaudeville troupe was booked into a New York City venue, and divorced in 1925; it was during this time she began to see significant career success, and she continued to use his last name professionally for the rest of her life. Though Baker traveled, she would return with gifts and money for her mother and younger half-sister, but larger career opportunities pushed her to make a trip to France.

 Career 
 Early career 
Baker's consistent badgering of a show manager in her hometown led to her being recruited for the St. Louis Chorus vaudeville show. At the age of 13, she headed to New York City during the Harlem Renaissance, and performed at the Plantation Club, Florence Mills' old stomping ground. After several auditions, she secured a role in the chorus line of a touring production of the groundbreaking and hugely successful Broadway revue Shuffle Along, (1921) that helped bring to the public's attention Florence Mills, Paul Robeson, and Adelaide Hall.

In Shuffle Along, Josephine was a dancer positioned at the end of a chorus line. Fearing she might be overshadowed by the other dancers, Josephine used her position to introduce a hint of comedy into her routine, thereby making her stand out from the other dancers. Josephine first entered Shuffle Along in one of the U.S. touring companies (not on Broadway) as she was still underage at the time. Once she became of age, she was transferred to the Broadway production where she remained for several months up until the show ended in 1923. The next revue Josephine went into was The Chocolate Dandies, which opened on September 1, 1924. Again, Josephine was cast in the chorus line. The show ran for 96 performances and closed in November 1925.

 Pre War Paris and rise to fame 

Baker was aged 19 at the time. In a 1974 interview with The Guardian, Baker explained that she obtained her first big break in the bustling city. "No, I didn't get my first break on Broadway. I was only in the chorus in Shuffle Along and Chocolate Dandies. I became famous first in France in the twenties. I just couldn't stand America and I was one of the first colored Americans to move to Paris. Oh yes, Bricktop was there as well. Me and her were the only two, and we had a marvelous time. Of course, everyone who was anyone knew Bricky. And they got to know Miss Baker as well."

In Paris, she became an instant success for her erotic dancing, and for appearing practically nude onstage. After a successful tour of Europe, she broke her contract and returned to France in 1926 to star at the Folies Bergère, setting the standard for her future acts.

Baker performed the "Danse Sauvage" wearing a costume consisting of a skirt made of a string of artificial bananas. Her success coincided (1925) with the Exposition des Arts Décoratifs, which gave birth to the term "Art Deco", and also with a renewal of interest in non-Western forms of art, including African. Baker represented one aspect of this fashion. In later shows in Paris, she was often accompanied on stage by her pet cheetah "Chiquita," who was adorned with a diamond collar. The cheetah frequently escaped into the orchestra pit, where it terrorized the musicians, adding another element of excitement to the show.

After a while, Baker was the most successful American entertainer working in France. Ernest Hemingway called her "the most sensational woman anyone ever saw". The author spent hours talking with her in Paris bars. Picasso drew paintings depicting her alluring beauty. Jean Cocteau became friendly with her and helped vault her to international stardom. Baker endorsed a "Bakerfix" hair gel, bananas, shoes, and cosmetics amongst other products.

In 1929, Baker became the first African-American star to visit Yugoslavia, while on tour in Central Europe via the Orient Express. In Belgrade, she performed at Luxor Balkanska, the most luxurious venue in the city at the time. She included Pirot kilim into her routine, as a nod to the local culture, and she donated some of the show's proceeds to poor children of Serbia. In Zagreb, she was received by adoring fans at the train station. However, some of her shows were cancelled, due to opposition from the local clergy and morality police.

During her travels in Yugoslavia, Baker was accompanied by "Count" Giuseppe Pepito Abatino. At the start of her career in France, Baker had met Abatino, a Sicilian former stonemason who passed himself off as a count, and who persuaded her to let him manage her. Abatino was not only Baker's management, but her lover as well. The two could not marry because Baker was still married to her second husband, Willie Baker.

During this period, she released her most successful song, "J'ai deux amours" (1931). The song expresses the sentiment that "I have two loves, my country and Paris." In a 2007 book, Tim Bergfelder, Sue Harris and Sarah Street claimed that "by the 1930's, Baker's assimilation into French popular culture had been completed by her association with the song". Baker starred in four films which found success only in Europe: the silent film Siren of the Tropics (1927), Zouzou (1934) and Princesse Tam Tam (1935). She starred in Fausse Alerte in 1940. Bergfelder, Harris and Street wrote that the silent film Siren of the Tropics "rehearses the 'primitive-to-Parisienne' narrative that would become the staple of Baker's cinema career, and exploited in particular her comic stage persona based on loose-limbed athleticism and artful clumsiness." The sound films Zouzou (1934) and Princesse Tam Tam were both star vehicles for Baker.

Under the management of Abatino, Baker's stage and public persona, as well as her singing voice, were transformed. In 1934, she took the lead in a revival of Jacques Offenbach's opera La créole, which premiered in December of that year for a six-month run at the Théâtre Marigny on the Champs-Élysées of Paris. In preparation for her performances, she went through months of training with a vocal coach. In the words of Shirley Bassey, who has cited Baker as her primary influence, "... she went from a petite danseuse sauvage with a decent voice to la grande diva magnifique ... I swear in all my life I have never seen, and probably never shall see again, such a spectacular singer and performer."

Despite her popularity in France, Baker never attained the equivalent reputation in America. Her star turn in a 1936 revival of Ziegfeld Follies on Broadway was not commercially successful, and later in the run she was replaced by Gypsy Rose Lee. Time magazine referred to her as a "Negro wench ... whose dancing and singing might be topped anywhere outside of Paris", while other critics said her voice was "too thin" and "dwarf-like" to fill the Winter Garden Theatre. She returned to Europe heartbroken. This contributed to Baker's becoming a legal citizen of France and giving up her American citizenship.

Baker returned to Paris in 1937, married the French industrialist Jean Lion, and became a French citizen. They were married in the French town of Crèvecœur-le-Grand, in a wedding presided over by the mayor, Jammy Schmidt.

Between 1933 and 1937 Baker was a guest at the start of the Tour de France on four occasions.

 World War II 

In September 1939, when France declared war on Germany in response to the invasion of Poland, Baker was recruited by the Deuxième Bureau, the French military intelligence agency, as an "honorable correspondent".  Baker worked with Jacques Abtey, the head of French counterintelligence in Paris.
She socialised with the Germans at embassies, ministries, night clubs, charming them while secretly gathering information. Her café-society fame enabled her to rub shoulders with those in the know, from high-ranking Japanese officials to Italian and Vichy bureaucrats, reporting to Abtey what she heard. She attended parties and gathered information at the Italian embassy without raising suspicion.

When the Germans invaded France, Baker left Paris and went to the Château des Milandes, her home in the Dordogne département in the south of France. She housed people who were eager to help the Free French effort led by Charles de Gaulle and supplied them with visas. As an entertainer, Baker had an excuse for moving around Europe, visiting neutral nations such as Portugal, as well as some in South America. She carried information for transmission to England, about airfields, harbors, and German troop concentrations in the West of France. Notes were written in invisible ink on Baker's sheet music. As written in Jazz Age Cleopatra, "She specialized in gatherings at embassies and ministries, charming people as she had always done, but at the same time trying to remember interesting items to transmit."

Later in 1941, she and her entourage went to the French colonies in North Africa. The stated reason was Baker's health (since she was recovering from another case of pneumonia) but the real reason was to continue helping the Resistance. From a base in Morocco, she made tours of Spain. She pinned notes with the information she gathered inside her underwear (counting on her celebrity to avoid a strip search). She met the Pasha of Marrakech, whose support helped her through a miscarriage (the last of several). After the miscarriage, she developed an infection so severe it required a hysterectomy. The infection spread and she developed peritonitis and then sepsis. After her recovery (which she continued to fall in and out of), she started touring to entertain British, French, and American soldiers in North Africa. The Free French had no organized entertainment network for their troops, so Baker and her entourage managed for the most part on their own. They allowed no civilians and charged no admission.

Baker's last marriage, to French composer and conductor Jo Bouillon, ended around the time she adopted her 11th child.

 Post War 

In 1949, a reinvented Baker returned in triumph to the Folies Bergère. Bolstered by recognition of her wartime heroism, Baker the performer assumed a new gravitas, unafraid to take on serious music or subject matter. The engagement was a rousing success and reestablished Baker as one of Paris' pre-eminent entertainers. In 1951 Baker was invited back to the United States for a nightclub engagement in Miami. After winning a public battle over desegregating the club's audience, Baker followed up her sold-out run at the club with a national tour. Rave reviews and enthusiastic audiences accompanied her everywhere, climaxed by a parade in Harlem in honor of her new title: NAACP's "Woman of the Year".

In 1952 Baker was hired to crown the Queen of the Cavalcade of Jazz for the famed eighth Cavalcade of Jazz concert held at Wrigley Field in Los Angeles, which was produced by Leon Hefflin, Sr. on June 1. Also featured to perform that day were Roy Brown and His Mighty Men, Anna Mae Winburn and Her Sweethearts, Toni Harper, Louis Jordan, Jimmy Witherspoon and Jerry Wallace.

An incident at the Stork Club in October 1951 interrupted and overturned her plans. Baker criticized the club's unwritten policy of discouraging Black patrons, then scolded columnist Walter Winchell, an old ally, for not rising to her defense. Winchell responded swiftly with a series of harsh public rebukes, including accusations of Communist sympathies (a serious charge at the time). The ensuing publicity resulted in the termination of Baker's work visa, forcing her to cancel all her engagements and return to France. It was almost a decade before U.S. officials allowed her back into the country.

In January 1966, Fidel Castro invited Baker to perform at the Teatro Musical de La Habana in Havana, Cuba, at the seventh-anniversary celebrations of his revolution. Her spectacular show in April broke attendance records. In 1968, Baker visited Yugoslavia and made appearances in Belgrade and in Skopje. In her later career, Baker faced financial troubles. She commented, "Nobody wants me, they've forgotten me"; but family members encouraged her to continue performing. In 1973 she performed at Carnegie Hall to a standing ovation.

The following year, she appeared in a Royal Variety Performance at the London Palladium, and then at the Monegasque Red Cross Gala, celebrating her 50 years in French show business. Advancing years and exhaustion began to take their toll; she sometimes had trouble remembering lyrics, and her speeches between songs tended to ramble. She still continued to captivate audiences of all ages.

 Civil rights activism 
Although based in France, Baker supported the Civil Rights Movement during the 1950s. When she arrived in New York with her husband Jo, they were refused reservations at 36 hotels because of racial discrimination. She was so upset by this treatment that she wrote articles about the segregation in the United States. She also began traveling into the South. She gave a talk at Fisk University, a historically black college in Nashville, Tennessee, on "France, North Africa and the Equality of the Races in France".

She refused to perform for segregated audiences in the United States, although she was offered $10,000 by a Miami club; the club eventually met her demands. Her insistence on mixed audiences helped to integrate live entertainment shows in Las Vegas, Nevada. After this incident, she began receiving threatening phone calls from people claiming to be from the Ku Klux Klan but said publicly that she was not afraid of them.

In 1951, Baker made charges of racism against Sherman Billingsley's Stork Club in Manhattan, where she had been refused service. Actress Grace Kelly, who was at the club at the time, rushed over to Baker, took her by the arm and stormed out with her entire party, vowing never to return (although she returned on 3 January 1956 with Prince Rainier of Monaco). The two women became close friends after the incident.

When Baker was near bankruptcy, Kelly—by then the princess consort—offered her a villa and financial assistance. (During his work on the Stork Club book, author and New York Times reporter Ralph Blumenthal was contacted by Jean-Claude Baker, one of Baker's sons. He indicated that he had read his mother's FBI file and, using comparison of the file to the tapes, said he thought the Stork Club incident was overblown.)

Baker also worked with the NAACP. Her reputation as a crusader grew to such an extent that the NAACP had Sunday 20 May 1951 declared "Josephine Baker Day". She was presented with life membership with the NAACP by Nobel Peace Prize winner Ralph Bunche. The honor she was paid spurred her to further her crusading efforts with the "Save Willie McGee" rally. McGee was a black man in Mississippi convicted of raping a white woman in 1945 on the basis of dubious evidence, and sentenced to death. Baker attended rallies for McGee and wrote letters to Fielding Wright, the governor of Mississippi, asking him to spare McGee's life. Despite her efforts, McGee was executed in 1951. As the decorated war hero who was bolstered by the racial equality she experienced in Europe, Baker became increasingly regarded as controversial; some black people even began to shun her, fearing that her outspokenness and racy reputation from her earlier years would hurt the cause.

In 1963, she spoke at the March on Washington at the side of Rev. Martin Luther King Jr. Baker was the only official female speaker. While wearing her Free French uniform emblazoned with her medal of the Légion d'honneur, she introduced the "Negro Women for Civil Rights". Rosa Parks and Daisy Bates were among those she acknowledged, and both gave brief speeches. Not everyone involved wanted Baker present at the March; some thought her time overseas had made her a woman of France, one who was disconnected from the Civil Rights issues going on in America. In her speech, one of the things Baker said:

I have walked into the palaces of kings and queens and into the houses of presidents. And much more. But I could not walk into a hotel in America and get a cup of coffee, and that made me mad. And when I get mad, you know that I open my big mouth. And then look out, 'cause when Josephine opens her mouth, they hear it all over the world ...

After King's assassination, his widow Coretta Scott King approached Baker in the Netherlands to ask if she would take her husband's place as leader of the Civil Rights Movement. After many days of thinking it over, Baker declined, saying her children were "too young to lose their mother".

 Personal life 
 Relationships 

Baker's first marriage was to American Pullman porter Willie Wells when she was only 13 years old. The union was reportedly very unhappy, and the couple divorced soon after marrying. Another short-lived marriage followed in 1921, to William Howard Baker. Because her career was already taking off under that last name, she retained it after the divorce. Although she ultimately had four marriages to men, Jean-Claude Baker wrote that Josephine was bisexual and had several relationships with women.

In 1925, she began an extramarital relationship with the Belgian novelist Georges Simenon.  On an ocean liner, in 1929,  en route from South America to France, Baker had an affair with the Swiss-French architect Le Corbusier (Charles-Édouard Jeanneret). In 1937, Baker married Frenchman Jean Lion, but they separated in 1940. She married French composer and conductor Jo Bouillon in 1947, and their union lasted 14 years before also ending in divorce. Later, she was involved with the artist Robert Brady for a time, but they never married. Speculation exists that Baker was also involved in sexual liaisons, if not relationships, with blues singer Clara Smith, Ada "Bricktop" Smith, French novelist Colette, and possibly Frida Kahlo.

 Children 

During her participation in the civil rights movement, Baker began to adopt children, forming a family which she often referred to as "The Rainbow Tribe". Baker wanted to prove that "children of different ethnicities and religions could still be brothers". She often took the children with her cross-country, and when they were at Château des Milandes, she arranged tours so visitors could walk the grounds and see how natural and happy the children were in "The Rainbow Tribe". Her estate featured hotels, a farm, rides, and the children singing and dancing for the audience. She charged an admission fee to visitors who entered and partook in the activities, which included watching the children play.

She created dramatic backstories for them, picking them with clear intent in mind: at one point, she wanted and planned to adopt a Jewish baby, but she settled for a French one. She also raised them in different religions in order to further her model for the world, taking two children from Algeria and raising one child as a Muslim and raising the other child as a Catholic. One member of the Tribe, Jean-Claude Baker, said: "She wanted a doll."

Baker raised two daughters, French-born Marianne and Moroccan-born Stellina, and 10 sons, Japanese-born Janot (born Teruya) and Akio, Colombian-born Luis, Finnish-born Jari (now Jarry), French-born Jean-Claude, Noël, and Moïse, Algerian-born Brahim (later Brian), Ivorian-born Koffi, and Venezuelan-born Mara. Later on, Josephine Baker would become the legal guardian of another boy, also named Jean-Claude, and considered him an unofficial addition to the Rainbow Tribe. For some time, Baker lived with her children and an enormous staff in the château in Dordogne, France, with her fourth husband, Jo Bouillon. Bouillon claimed that Baker bore one child, it was stillborn in 1941, an incident that precipitated an emergency hysterectomy.

Baker forced Jarry to leave the château and live with his adoptive father, Jo Bouillon, in Argentina, at the age of 15, after discovering that he was gay. Moïse died of cancer in 1999, and Noël was diagnosed with schizophrenia and is in a psychiatric hospital as of 2009. Jean-Claude Baker committed suicide in 2015, aged 71.

 Later years and death 
In her later years Baker converted to Catholicism. In 1968, Baker lost her château owing to unpaid debts; afterwards Princess Grace offered her an apartment in Roquebrune, near Monaco.

Baker was back on stage at the Olympia in Paris in 1968, in Belgrade and at Carnegie Hall in 1973 and at the Royal Variety Performance at the London Palladium and at the Gala du Cirque in Paris in 1974. On 8 April 1975 Baker starred in a retrospective revue at the Bobino in Paris, Joséphine à Bobino 1975, celebrating her 50 years in show business. The revue, financed by Prince Rainier, Princess Grace, and Jacqueline Kennedy Onassis, opened to rave reviews. Demand for seating was such that fold-out chairs had to be added to accommodate spectators. The opening-night audience included Sophia Loren, Mick Jagger, Shirley Bassey, Diana Ross and Liza Minnelli.

Four days later Baker was found lying peacefully in her bed surrounded by newspapers with glowing reviews of her performance. She was in a coma after suffering a cerebral hemorrhage. She was taken to Pitié-Salpêtrière Hospital, where she died, aged 68, on 12 April 1975.

Baker received a full Catholic funeral at L'Église de la Madeleine, attracting more than 20,000 mourners. The only American-born woman to receive full French military honors at her funeral, Baker's funeral was the occasion of a huge procession. After a family service at Saint-Charles Church in Monte Carlo, Baker was interred at Monaco's Cimetière de Monaco.

 Legacy Place Joséphine Baker in the Montparnasse Quarter of Paris was named in her honor. She has also been inducted into the St. Louis Walk of Fame, and on March 29, 1995, into the Hall of Famous Missourians. St. Louis's Channing Avenue was renamed Josephine Baker Boulevard, and a wax sculpture of Baker is on permanent display at The Griot Museum of Black History.

In 2015 she was inducted into the Legacy Walk in Chicago, Illinois. The Piscine Joséphine Baker is a swimming pool along the banks of the Seine in Paris named after her.

Writing in the on-line BBC magazine in late 2014, Darren Royston, historical dance teacher at RADA credited Baker with being the Beyoncé of her day, and bringing the Charleston to Britain. Two of Baker's sons, Jean-Claude and Jarry (Jari), grew up to go into business together, running the restaurant Chez Josephine on Theatre Row, 42nd Street, New York City. It celebrates Baker's life and works.

Château des Milandes, a castle near Sarlat in the Dordogne, was Baker's home where she raised her twelve children. It is open to the public and displays her stage outfits including her banana skirt (of which there are apparently several). It also displays many family photographs and documents as well as her Legion of Honour medal. Most rooms are open for the public to walk through including bedrooms with the cots where her children slept, a huge kitchen, and a dining room where she often entertained large groups. The bathrooms were designed in art deco style but most rooms retained the French chateau style.

Baker continued to influence celebrities more than a century after her birth. In a 2003 interview with USA Today, Angelina Jolie cited Baker as "a model for the multiracial, multinational family she was beginning to create through adoption". Beyoncé performed Baker's banana dance at the Fashion Rocks concert at Radio City Music Hall in September 2006.

Writing on the 110th anniversary of her birth, Vogue described how her 1926 "danse sauvage" in her famous banana skirt "brilliantly manipulated the white male imagination" and "radically redefined notions of race and gender through style and performance in a way that continues to echo throughout fashion and music today, from Prada to Beyoncé."

On June 3, 2017, the 111th anniversary of her birth, Google released an animated Google Doodle, which consists of a slideshow chronicling her life and achievements.

On Thursday November 22, 2018 a documentary entitled Josephine Baker: The Story of an Awakening, directed by Ilana Navaro, premiered at the Beirut Art Film Festival. It contains rarely seen archival footage, including some never before discovered, with music and narration.

In August 2019 Baker was one of those inducted in the Rainbow Honor Walk, a walk of fame in San Francisco's Castro District noting LGBTQ people who have "made significant contributions in their fields".

 Panthéon in Paris 

In May 2021 an online petition was set up by writer Laurent Kupferman asking that Joséphine Baker be honoured by being reburied at the Panthéon in Paris or being granted Panthéon honours, which would make her only the sixth woman at the mausoleum alongside Simone Veil, Geneviève de Gaulle-Anthonioz, Marie Curie, Germaine Tillion, and Sophie Berthelot. In August 2021 the French President, Emmanuel Macron, announced that Baker's remains would be reburied at the Panthéon in November 2021, following the petition and continued requests from Baker's family since 2013. Her son Claude Bouillon-Baker, however, told Agence France-Presse that her body would remain in Monaco and only a plaque would be installed at the Panthéon. It was later announced that a symbolic casket containing soil from various locations where Baker had lived, including St. Louis, Paris, the South of France and Monaco, would be carried by the French Air and Space Force in a parade in Paris before a ceremony at the Panthéon where the casket was interred. The ceremony took place on Tuesday 30 November 2021, and Baker thus became the first black woman to be honored in the secular temple to the "great men" of the French Republic.

 Works portraying or inspired by Baker 

 Film and television 
 Diana Ross portrayed Baker in her Tony Award-winning Broadway and television show An Evening with Diana Ross. When the show was made into an NBC television special entitled The Big Event: An Evening with Diana Ross, Ross again portrayed Baker.
 In 1991, Baker's life story, The Josephine Baker Story, was broadcast on HBO. Lynn Whitfield portrayed Baker, and won an Emmy Award for Outstanding Lead Actress in a Miniseries or a Special – becoming the first Black actress to win the award in this category.
 A German submariner mimics Baker's Danse banane in the 1981 film Das Boot.
 In the 1997 animated musical film Anastasia, Baker appears with her cheetah during the musical number "Paris Holds the Key (to Your Heart)".
 In 2002, Baker was portrayed by Karine Plantadit in the biopic Frida.
 A character who is based on Baker (topless, wearing the famous "banana skirt") appears in the opening sequence of the 2003 animated film The Triplets of Belleville (Les Triplettes de Belleville).
 Her influence upon and assistance to the careers of the husband and wife dancers Carmen De Lavallade and Geoffrey Holder are discussed and illustrated in rare footage in the 2005 Linda Atkinson/Nick Doob documentary, Carmen and Geoffrey.
 In 2011, Sonia Rolland portrayed Baker in the film Midnight in Paris.
 In February 2017, Tiffany Daniels portrayed Baker in the Timeless television episode "The Lost Generation".
 In May 2020, Astrid Jones portrayed Baker in the El ministerio del tiempo television episode "La memoria del tiempo (The memory of time)".
 Baker is portrayed by actress Carra Patterson in the seventh episode, entitled "I Am.", of HBO’s television series Lovecraft Country.

 Stage 
 In 1986, Helen Gelzer portrayed Baker on the London stage for a limited run in the musical Josephine – "a musical version of the life and times of Josephine Baker" with book, lyrics and music by Michael Wild. The show was produced by Baker's longtime friend Jack Hockett in conjunction with Premier Box-Office, and the musical director was Paul Maguire. Gelzer also recorded a studio cast album titled Josephine.
 In 2006, Jérôme Savary produced a musical, A La Recherche de Josephine – New Orleans for Ever (Looking for Josephine), starring Nicolle Rochelle.  The story revolved around the history of jazz and Baker's career.
 In 2006, Deborah Cox starred in the musical Josephine at Florida's Asolo Theatre, directed and choreographed by Joey McKneely, with a book by Ellen Weston and Mark Hampton, music by Steve Dorff and lyrics by John Bettis.
 In July 2012, Cheryl Howard opened in The Sensational Josephine Baker, written and performed by Howard and directed by Ian Streicher at the Beckett Theatre of Theatre Row on 42nd Street in New York City, just a few doors away from Chez Josephine.
 In July 2013, Cush Jumbo's debut play Josephine and I premiered at the Bush Theatre, London. It was re-produced in New York City at The Public Theater's Joe's Pub from 27 February to 5 April 2015.
 In June 2016, Josephine, a burlesque cabaret dream play starring Tymisha Harris as Josephine Baker premiered at the 2016 San Diego Fringe Festival. The show has since played across North America and had a limited off-Broadway run in January–February 2018 at SoHo Playhouse in New York City.
 In late February 2017, a new play about Baker's later years, The Last Night of Josephine Baker by playwright Vincent Victoria, opened in Houston, Texas, starring Erica Young as "Past Josephine" and Jasmin Roland as "Present Josephine".
 Actress DeQuina Moore portrayed Baker in a biographic musical titled Josephine Tonight at The Ensemble Theatre in Houston, Texas, from 27 June to 28 July 2019.
 In September 2021, Theatre Royal, Bath, in conjunction with Oxford Playhouse and Wales Millennium Centre produced a UK touring production of Josephine co-written by Leona Allen and Jesse Briton who also directed the show. It toured the UK and featured Ebony Feare in the lead role as Josephine Baker.
 In 2022 Dynamic Lunchbox Entertainment of Orlando Florida is touring "Josephine, a burlesque cabaret dream play", co-created and starring Tymisha Harris, around Canada and the U.S.

 Literature 
Baker appears in her role as a member of the French Resistance in Johannes Mario Simmel's 1960 novel, Es muss nicht immer Kaviar sein (C'est pas toujours du caviar). The 2004 erotic novel Scandalous by British author Angela Campion uses Baker as its heroine and is inspired by Baker's sexual exploits and later adventures in the French Resistance. In the novel, Baker, working with a fictional Black Canadian lover named Drummer Thompson, foils a plot by French fascists in 1936 Paris. Baker was heavily featured in the 2012 book Josephine's Incredible Shoe & The Blackpearls by Peggi Eve Anderson-Randolph. In his novel Noire, la neige, Marseille,  Editions Parenthèses, Pascal Rannou evokes the relationship between Valaida Snow and Josephine Baker, who is one of the main characters of this story.

 Music 
 The Italian-Belgian francophone singer composer Salvatore Adamo pays tribute to Baker with the song "Noël Sur Les Milandes" (album Petit Bonheur – EMI 1970).
 The British band Sailor paid tribute on their 1974 self-titled debut album Sailor with the Georg Kajanus song "Josephine Baker" who "...stunned the world at the Folies Bergere..."
The title track of the 1987 Premiata Forneria Marconi album 'Miss Baker' was written in honor of the American dancer Josephine Baker.
 British singer-songwriter, Al Stewart wrote a song about Josephine Baker. It appears on the album Last days of the century from 1988.
 Beyoncé Knowles has portrayed Baker on various occasions. During the 2006 Fashion Rocks show, Knowles performed "Dejá Vu" in a revised version of the Danse banane costume. In Knowles's video for "Naughty Girl", she is seen dancing in a huge champagne glass à la Baker. In I Am ... Yours: An Intimate Performance at Wynn Las Vegas, Beyoncé lists Baker as an influence of a section of her live show.
 In 2010, Keri Hilson portrayed Baker in her single "Pretty Girl Rock".
 In January 2022 Laquita Mitchell sang the title role in the New Orleans Opera production of Josephine by Tom Cipullo.

 Artworks 
In 1927, Alexander Calder created Josephine Baker (III), a wire sculpture of Baker, which is now displayed at the Museum of Modern Art. Henri Matisse created a mural-sized cut paper artwork titled La Négresse (1952–1953), possibly inspired by Baker. Hassan Musa depicted Baker in a 1994 series of paintings called Who needs Bananas? Film credits 

 Documentaries 
 Joséphine Baker. Black Diva in a White Mans World. Film by Annette von Wangenheim, about Baker's life and work from a perspective that analyses images of Black people in popular culture, WDR/3sat, 2006

 “Josephine Baker: The Story of an Awakening,”'' directed by Ilana Navaro, premiered at the Beirut Art Film Festival in 2018.

Notes

References

Bibliography

External links 

 
 
 
  (self)
 
 
 
 The electric body: Nancy Cunard sees Josephine Baker (2003) – review essay of dance style and contemporary critics
 Collection: Josephine Baker papers at Houghton Library, Harvard University
 
 Norwood, Arlisha. "Josephine Baker". National Women's History Museum. 2017.
 Josephine Baker papers, 1931–1968 at the Stuart A. Rose Manuscript, Archives, and Rare Book Library
 Finding aid to the Josephine Baker collection at Columbia University. Rare Book & Manuscript Library.

20th-century African-American women singers
American emigrants to France
American female erotic dancers
American burlesque performers
Cabaret singers
1906 births
1975 deaths
Chevaliers of the Légion d'honneur
Female recipients of the Croix de Guerre (France)
Actresses from St. Louis
French anti-racism activists
Burials in Monaco
Columbia Records artists
Converts to Roman Catholicism
Female resistance members of World War II
French buskers
French female erotic dancers
French film actresses
French-language singers of the United States
French people of African-American descent
French Resistance members
French Roman Catholics
French spies
French vedettes
Harlem Renaissance
Mercury Records artists
Music hall performers
Naturalized citizens of France
People from St. Louis
People who renounced United States citizenship
RCA Victor artists
Recipients of the Croix de Guerre 1939–1945 (France)
Recipients of the Resistance Medal
Traditional pop music singers
Vaudeville performers
French women in World War II
Articles containing video clips
20th-century French actresses
20th-century French women singers
French Freemasons
Female wartime spies
African-American Catholics
Roman Catholic activists